Military supply-chain management is a cross-functional approach to procuring, producing and delivering products and services for military materiel applications. Military supply chain management includes sub-suppliers, suppliers, internal information and funds flow.

Supply
A supply is the procurement, distribution, maintenance while in storage, and salvage of supplies, including the determination of kind and quantity of supplies. The producer phase of a military supply extends from determination of procurement schedules to acceptance of finished supplies by the military services. The consumer phase of a military supply extends from receipt of finished supplies by the military services, through issue for use or consumption.

Supply chain
The supply chain is the linked activities associated with providing material from a raw material stage to an end user as a finished good. Supply control
is the process by which an item of supply is controlled within the supply system, including requisitioning, receipt, storage, stock control, shipment, disposition, identification, and accounting. The supply point is a location where supplies, services and materials are located and issued. These locations are temporary and mobile, normally being occupied for up to 72 hours.

Logistics

Military logistics is the science of planning and carrying out the movement and maintenance of armed forces. In its most comprehensive sense, those aspects of military operations that deal with: a. design and development, acquisition, storage, movement, distribution, maintenance, evacuation, and disposition of materiel; b. movement, evacuation, and hospitalization of personnel; c. acquisition or construction, maintenance, operation and disposition of facilities; and d. acquisition or furnishing of services.

Logistics versus supply-chain management

The major difference between the concept of logistic management and supply-chain management is the level of information gathered, processes, analysed and used for decision making. An SCM-based organization not only having concerns with its immediate clients but also handles and forecasts the factors affecting directly or indirectly their supplier or suppliers or on their client or clients. If we exclude this information part out of supply chain model then we can see the logistic management part of the business.

Limitations of military supply chain

Unlike standard supply-chain management practices world-wide, some major concepts are not supported in the military domain.  For example, the "just-in-time" (JIT) model emphasizes holding less (or no) inventory, whereas in military supply chains, due to the high costs of a stock-out (potentially placing lives in danger), keeping huge inventory is a more acceptable practice.  Some examples of these are the ammunition dump and oil depot.

Likewise, the military procurement process has much different criteria than the normal business procurement process. Military needs call for reliability of supply during peace and war, as compared to price and technology factors.

See also
Ammunition dump
Loss of Strength Gradient
Principles of sustainment
Supply-chain management

Notes

External links
Department of Defense - Supply Chain Management Regulation

Military logistics
Military terminology